The Same Door is a collection of 16 works of short fiction by John Updike published in 1959 by Alfred A. Knopf. The stories in the volume first appeared separately in The New Yorker, some in a slightly different form than in the collection. The Same Door is Updike’s first volume of short stories.

Stories

All the works in this collection first appeared in The New Yorker

"Friends from Philadelphia" (October 22, 1954)
"Ace in the Hole" (April 1, 1955)
"Tomorrow and Tomorrow and So Forth" (April 22, 1955)
"Dentistry and Doubt" (April 21, 1955)
"The Kid's Whistling" (November 25, 1955)
"Toward Evening" (February 3, 1956)
"Snowing in Greenwich Village" (January 13, 1956)
"Who Made Yellow Roses Yellow?" (March 30, 1956)
"Sunday Teasing" (October 5, 1956)
"His Finest Hour" (June 15, 1956)
"A Trillion Feet of Gas" (November 30, 1956)
"Incest" (June 21, 1957)
"A Gift From the City" (April 4, 1958)
"Intercession" (August 22, 1958)
"The Alligators" (March 14, 1958)
"The Happiest I've Been" (December 26, 1958)

Critical Assessment

Writing about the author's second collection, Pigeon Feathers, in The New York Times Book Review, critic Arthur Mizener wrote of Updike's early achievement as a whole:

Professor Richard H. Rupp offers this measured appraisal of The Same Door:

Theme and Style

The collection is divided into stories with a boyish protagonist set in either an unnamed small town or Olinger, Pennsylvania—the fictional name Updike gave to his hometown—and stories set mostly in Manhattan, New York and other cities, including London, with a young adult man often at the center.

The stories that comprise the volume were written over a period of five years, composed between November 1955 to April 1957, and possess some degree of consistency in their style and structure. Indeed, half of the stories, which are set in Manhattan, are “remarkably homogeneous.” Professor Richard H. Rupp writes: “The most obvious characteristic of Updike’s style is his exhaustive exploration of minute physical detail. Even in his first collection, The Same Door, the scene is microscopic.”

Literary critic Robert Detweiler locates the central thematic element of the stories in “the unexpected gifts of personal encounter”, and quotes Updike’s remark regarding the Olinger Stories: “The point, to me, is plain…We are all rewarded unexpectedly.” Detwieler acknowledges Updike’s debt to James Joyce:

Footnotes

Sources 
 Begley, Adam. 2014. Updike. Harpercollins publishers, New York. 
Carduff, Christopher.  2013. Ref. 1  Note on the Texts in John Updike: Collected Early Stories. Christopher Carduff, editor. The Library of America. pp. 910-924 
Detweiler, Robert. 1984. John Updike. Twayne Publishers, G. K. Hall & Co., Boston, Massachusetts.  (Paperback).
 Mizener, Arthur 1962. Pigeon Feathers.  The New York Times Book Review, March 18, 1962.https://archive.nytimes.com/www.nytimes.com/books/97/04/06/lifetimes/updike-r-pigeon2.html Retrieved 02 March, 2023.
 Pritchard, Richard H.. 2000. Updike: America’s Man of Letters. Steerforth Press, Southroyalton, Vermont.
Rupp, Richard H.. 1970. John Updike: Style in Search of a Center, from Celebration in Post-War American Fiction: 1945-1967, University of Miami Press,  in John Updike: Modern Critical Views, Harold Bloom, editor. 

Short story collections by John Updike
1959 short story collections
Works originally published in The New Yorker
Alfred A. Knopf books